Bourg-Saint-Maurice station (French: Gare de Bourg-Saint-Maurice) is a railway station in Bourg-Saint-Maurice, Auvergne-Rhône-Alpes in south-east France.

The station is located at the end of the St-Pierre-d'Albigny-Bourg-Saint-Maurice railway. The station is served by TGV (high-speed long-distance) and TER (regional) services operated by SNCF. During the winter months Eurostar services from London and Thalys services from Amsterdam and Brussels travel to Bourg-Saint-Maurice. The station was heavily rebuilt for the 1992 Winter Olympics at Albertville. The station also features some sidings for passenger trains when not in use.

Juxtaposed controls are in operation in the station for Eurostar passengers travelling to the UK. They clear exit checks from the Schengen Area (carried out by Customs officers) as well as UK entry immigration checks (conducted by the UK Border Force) in the station before boarding their train.

Train services
The following TGV services currently call at Bourg-Saint-Maurice:

See also
List of border crossing points in France

References

External links
 Timetables, TER Auvergne-Rhône-Alpes
Eurostar Website
Thalys Website
NS Hispeed Website 

Railway stations in Savoie
Railway stations in France opened in 1913
French railway stations with juxtaposed controls